Margaret "Maggie" O'Neill (born 15 November 1962) is an English actress. She is known for her television roles in Peak Practice (2000–2002), Shameless (2004–2007) and EastEnders (2008). In 1986 she appeared in the music video for Simply Red's single "Holding Back The Years". In 1988, she appeared in the film Gorillas in the Mist.

Biography
The youngest of six Catholic brothers and sisters  born to head-teacher parents, O'Neill grew up in the Midlands, where she was educated at a convent school, and, after being inspired by a sixth-form drama teacher, "fell" into acting.

After training at the Guildhall School of Music and Drama, she starred in the video for Simply Red's "Holding Back the Years" in 1986, before making her professional stage debut in Moving Pictures, by Stephen Lowe, at the West Yorkshire Playhouse, Leeds, in 1985. After making her professional screen debut in the British production Mona Lisa opposite Bob Hoskins in 1986, she made her Hollywood debut in the Sigourney Weaver film Gorillas in the Mist in 1988. She played alongside Keith Barron and Annette Crosbie in the 1989 TV series Take Me Home.

O'Neill played Alex Redman in ITV's medical drama Peak Practice, and appeared as Sheila Jackson in Channel 4's comedy drama Shameless. O'Neill also played Max and Jack Branning's sister Suzy in the BBC1 soap opera EastEnders for five months in 2008, until the Boxing Day episode.

Filmography

Mona Lisa (1986) as Girl in Paradise Club
Wherever You Are... (1988) as Julian's second wife
Gorillas in the Mist (1988) as Kim
Defrosting the Fridge (1988) (TV)
Jim Henson's The Storyteller – Greek Myths (TV) {Theseus and the Minotaur} as Ariadne
Take Me Home BBC – Three Part TV Drama (1989) (TV) as Kathy 
 (1989) as Berta
Inspector Morse (1991) (TV) in episode "Fat Chance" as Hilary Dobson
Under Suspicion (1991) as Hazel Aaron
Boon (1991) (TV) in episode "Lie of the Land" as Amanda Shepley
The Life and Times of Henry Pratt (1992) TV
Friday on My Mind (1992) BBC TV as Louise
When Pigs Fly (1993) as Sheila
Cadfael (1994) (TV) in episode "One Corpse Too Many" as Aline Siward
All Men Are Mortal (1995) as Florence
Killing Me Softly (1995) (TV) as Sara Thornton
The Fix (1997) (TV) as Marina Kay
Invasion: Earth (1998) (TV) as Amanda Tucker
Births, Marriages and Deaths (1999) as Alex
Hero of the Hour (2000) (TV) as Alison Liddle
Peak Practice (2001, 2002) (TV) as Alex Redman
White Teeth (2002) (TV) as Poppy Burt-Jones
Murder in Mind (2002) (TV) in episode "Rage"
Blue Murder (2004) in episode "Lonely" (TV) as Matilda Urwin
Shameless (2004–2007) (TV) as Sheila Jackson
Midsomer Murders (2004) (TV) in episode "The Straw Woman" as Agnes Waterhouse.
Wild at Heart (2007) as Elaine
Mansfield Park (2007) as Mrs Norris
Little Devil (2007) (TV) as Laura Crowe
The Royal (2007) (TV) as Jane Cooper in episode #2.5
EastEnders (2008) (TV) as Suzy Branning
New Tricks (2010) (TV) in episode "Gloves Off" as Ronni Mayfair
Inspector George Gently (2012) (TV) in episode "Gently Northern Soul" as Matilda Braithwaite
Truckers (2013) (TV) as Sue
A Gert Lush Christmas (2015) (TV) as Aunty Jade
Death in Paradise (2016) as Perrie Campbell episode #5.8
The Halcyon (2017) (TV) as Gloria episode #1.4
Midsomer Murders (2018) (TV) in episode #19.6, "The Curse of the Ninth" as Audrey Glenhill.
Unforgotten as Ellen Price episodes #2.4 & #2.5
Call the Midwife (2018) as Mae Stanton episode #7.2
Father Brown as Mrs. Kendall in episode #7.9 “The Skylark Scandal" (2019)
Two Doors Down (2019) as Sandra
White Lines (2020) as Yoana 
Casualty (2021) as Cindy

Other appearances
Simply Red, "Holding Back The Years" (1985) (music video) as the young teacher
Clock Opera, "The Lost Buoys" (2012) (music video) as the wife

References

External links

1962 births
Living people
Actresses from Buckinghamshire
Alumni of the Guildhall School of Music and Drama
English Roman Catholics
English people of Irish descent
English television actresses
English film actresses
English stage actresses
English soap opera actresses
20th-century English actresses
21st-century English actresses